Charas is a 2004 Indian Hindi-language action thriller film directed by Tigmanshu Dhulia. Set in Kasol, a village near Manikaran in Kullu, Himachal Pradesh, the film deals with illegal drug trade. It stars Jimmy Sheirgill, Uday Chopra and Irrfan Khan with Kabir Sadanand, Namrata Shirodkar, and Hrishita Bhatt playing supporting roles.

Cast
 Jimmy Sheirgill as Dev Anand
 Uday Chopra as ACP Ashraf A. Khan
 Irrfan Khan as Policeman/DCP Randhir Singh Rathore
 Namrata Shirodkar as Piya Goswami
 Hrishita Bhatt as Naina Thakur
 Anup Soni as ACP Yashpal Chaturvedi
 Varun Badola as Amin Mohammed
 Kabir Sadanand ACP Siddharth Negi
 Sanjay Mishra as the blind man
 Deepak Dobriyal as Afghan militant
 Adam Bedi as Sam Higgins
 Rajiv Gupta

Music

The soundtrack of Charas was composed by Raju Singh with the lyrics being written by Javed Akhtar and Tigmanshu Dhulia.

Critical reception
The film received mixed reviews. Taran Adarsh from Bollywood Hungama rated 1 out of 5, terming it as "a half-baked product that disappoints". Vivek Fernandes from Rediff stated the film as "compelling watch. So catch it, even if it is just for kicks." Kaveree Bamzai from India Today criticised the film as a "completely flat entertainer".

References

External links
 
 Charas at Yash Raj Films portal

2004 films
Films about organised crime in India
2004 action thriller films
Indian action thriller films
Indian crime action films
Indian crime thriller films
Films about the illegal drug trade
Indian films about cannabis
Films set in Himachal Pradesh
Yash Raj Films films
2000s Hindi-language films
2000s buddy cop films
Films distributed by Yash Raj Films
Films directed by Tigmanshu Dhulia
2004 crime thriller films
Films about the Narcotics Control Bureau